Sacha inchi nut oil is extracted by pressing from the seeds and flesh of the fruit of the Plukenetia volubilis, or pracaxi, a tree native to the area surrounding the Amazon River.

Sacha Inchi oil has with approximately 50% a very high content of the omega-3 fatty acid alpha-linolenic acid, which makes it comparable to flaxseed oil. Sacha Inchi oil has a very high content of Tocopherols (176–226 mg/100 g) which consists predominantly of gamma-Tocopherol (50%) and delta-Tocopherol.

Pracaxi 
While Sacha Inchi is called 'Pracaxi' there are other plants with very different properties by the same name.  Not to be confused with Sacha Inchi is the oil of Pentaclethara macroloba which is also called Pracaxi.  This oil is distinguished by a particular high amount of the fatty acid behenic acid, a characteristic that it shares with ben oil.

References 

Vegetable oils